Richard M. McMeekin was a politician in the Canadian province of Ontario, who served in the Legislative Assembly of Ontario in 1937. He represented the electoral district of Sault Ste. Marie as a member of the Ontario Liberal Party.

McMeekin won the seat in the 1937 election. However, after just two weeks in office, he resigned to open a seat for former federal MP Colin Campbell to enter provincial politics in a by-election, after Campbell was defeated in the district of Frontenac-Addington on election day. Prior to his election to the legislature, McMeekin served two years as mayor of Sault Ste. Marie.

References

External links
 

Year of birth missing
Year of death missing
Ontario Liberal Party MPPs
Mayors of Sault Ste. Marie, Ontario